This article lists notable civilian accidents involving fissile nuclear material or nuclear reactors. Military accidents are listed at List of military nuclear accidents. Civil radiation accidents not involving fissile material are listed at List of civilian radiation accidents. For a general discussion of both civilian and military accidents, see Nuclear and radiation accidents.

Scope of this article
In listing civilian nuclear accidents, the following criteria have been followed:
 Notably severe: there must be well-attested and substantial health damage, property damage or contamination; if an International Nuclear Event Scale (INES) level is available, of at least two.
 Nuclear aspect: the damage must be related directly to nuclear operations or materials; the event should involve fissile material or a reactor, not merely (for example) having occurred at the site of a nuclear power plant.
 Primarily civilian: the nuclear operation/material must be principally for non-military purposes.

1950s

1960s

1970s

1980s

1990s

2000s

2010s

See also
 Criticality accident
 International Nuclear Events Scale
 List of Chernobyl-related articles
 List of civilian nuclear incidents
 List of civilian radiation accidents
 List of industrial disasters
 List of military nuclear accidents
 List of crimes involving radioactive substances
 List of nuclear reactorsa comprehensive annotated list of the world's nuclear reactors
 Lists of nuclear disasters and radioactive incidents
 Nuclear and radiation accidents
 Nuclear reactor technology
 Nuclear power
 Nuclear power debate
 Radiation
 List of hydroelectric power station failures

References

External links
 Nuclear power plant accidents: listed and ranked since 1952
 Timeline: Nuclear plant accidents
 ProgettoHumus – Mondo in Cammino: List updated of nuclear accidents in the history
 Schema-root.org: Nuclear Power Accidents  2 topics, both with a current news feed
 US Nuclear Regulatory Commission (NRC) website with search function and electronic public reading room
 International Atomic Energy Agency website with extensive online library
 Canada's Nuclear Safety Commission (CNSC)
 Concerned Citizens for Nuclear Safety Detailed articles on nuclear watchdog activities in the US
 World Nuclear Association: Radiation Doses Background on ionizing radiation and doses
 Canadian Centre for Occupational Health & Safety More information on radiation units and doses.
 Radiological Incidents Database Extensive, well-referenced list of radiological incidents.
 Critical Hour: Three Mile Island, The Nuclear Legacy, And National Security Online book by Albert J. Fritsch, Arthur H. Purcell, and Mary Byrd Davis
 Annotated bibliography on civilian nuclear accidents from the Alsos Digital Library for Nuclear Issues.
 Partial list of Indian nuclear accidents

 

Lists of nuclear disasters
Nuclear technology-related lists